Privates on Parade is a 1982 film adaptation of the Peter Nichols play of the same name about a fictional – and mostly gay – military entertainment group, the "Song and Dance Unit, Southeast Asia" assembled to entertain the troops in the Malayan jungle during the Malayan Emergency.

Cast and characters
 John Cleese – Maj. Giles Flack
 Denis Quilley – Capt. Terri Dennis
 Nicola Pagett – Sylvia Morgan
 Patrick Pearson – Sgt. Steven Flowers
 Michael Elphick – Sgt. Maj. Reg Drummond
 David Bamber – Sgt. Charles Bishop
 Bruce Payne – Flight Sgt. Kevin Cartwright
 Tim Barlow – Commanding Officer
 Ishaq Bux – Sikh Doorman
 Steve Dixon – Drummer
 David Griffin – Infantry Officer in the Bush
 Peter Hutchinson – Trumpet Player
 Jasper Jacob – Bass Player
 Simon Jones – Sgt. Eric Young-Love
 Brigitte Kahn – Mrs. Reg Drummond
 Robin Langford – Electrician
 Joe Melia – Sgt. Len Bonny
 William Parker – Armed Escort
 Neil Pearson – Band Pianist
 John Quayle – Capt. Henry Cox
 Julian Sands – Sailor
 John Standing – Capt. Sholto Savory
 Philip Tan – Lee
 Vincent Wong – Cheng

Reception

One critic stated that Privates on Parade was 'better suited to the theatre'. Derek Winnert stated that 'there are some good jokes and songs, but Privates on Parade is sometimes a bit dodgy and dated, and the lurch into serious drama at the end works no better on film than it did on stage'. Vincent Canby described the film as 'fine, witty, extremely self-assured [and] something seldom seen in movies-a melodramatic farce that comes complete with songs, dances, lewd jokes, sudden death, teary sentiment and smashing performances'.

References

External links
 
 

1982 films
1982 comedy films
Films about the British Army
British LGBT-related films
British films based on plays
Films set in the 1940s
Military humor in film
British comedy films
1980s English-language films
1980s British films